Jorge Sixto Lozada Stanbury (6 April 1931 – 11 April 2018) was a Peruvian politician. He was elected to Congress from 1963 to 1965, served on the Constituent Assembly, and sat in the Senate from 1985 to 1992. He served as the President of the Senate in 1988. He belonged to the prominent Spanish Lozada family.

References

1931 births
2018 deaths
Members of the Congress of the Republic of Peru
Presidents of the Senate of Peru
American Popular Revolutionary Alliance politicians
People from Arequipa